Potomac TRACON (Terminal Radar Approach CONtrol), abbreviated PCT, is the FAA air traffic control facility in charge of the Washington, D.C. airspace and Washington Special Flight Rules Area, assigning squawk codes. It is based in Warrenton, Virginia, United States.

PCT is a consolidation of 4 former TRACON facilities controlling air traffic for the region's 4 major airports: Washington Dulles International Airport, Washington National Airport, Baltimore-Washington International Airport, and Richmond International Airport. PCT is organized into 4 areas, still associated with those geographic regions:
Shenandoah (SHD) covers Dulles and the west area of PCT
Mount Vernon (MTV) covers the Washington National Airport, Joint Base Andrews, and surrounding region
Chesapeake (CHP) covers BWI and the northern area of PCT
James River (JRV) covers Richmond and the southern area of PCT

Air traffic control in the United States
Aviation in Washington, D.C.